John David Souther is the self-titled debut album American singer-songwriter J.D. Souther, released in 1972. The song "How Long" was recorded in 2007 by the Eagles on their album Long Road Out of Eden, from which it was released as a single. It was a Grammy award winner for them under the "Best Country Performance by a Duo or Group with Vocal" category. "Run Like a Thief" was covered by Bonnie Raitt on her album Home Plate.

Background
Souther was one of the first artists signed by David Geffen to Asylum records. He had previously collaborated with Glenn Frey in a folk duo called Longbranch Pennywhistle. Souther later joined with Chris Hillman and Richie Furay to form the Souther-Hillman-Furay Band after the release of his solo debut. They recorded two albums before he returned to his solo career.

Reception

In his retrospective review for Allmusic, critic Lindsay Planer wrote the album "bears the same earthy Southwestern textures that are inextricably linked to the roots of the country/rock subgenre.".

Track listing
All songs by J.D. Souther.

"The Fast One" – 3:10
"Run Like a Thief" – 3:15
"Jesus in 3/4 Time" – 3:38
"Kite Woman" – 3:06
"Some People Call It Music" – 3:16
"White Wing" – 4:21
"It's the Same" – 3:32
"How Long" – 3:22
"Out to Sea" – 5:03
"Lullaby" – 1:35

Personnel
J.D. Souther – guitar, piano, vocals
John Barbata – drums
Michael Bowden – bass
Fred Catero – guitar
Ned Doheny – guitar
Glenn Frey – guitar, piano, backing vocals
Bryan Garofalo – bass
Gib Guilbeau – fiddle, violin
David Jackson – bass, piano, keyboards
Gary Mallaber – drums, keyboards
Mickey McGee – drums
Wayne Perkins – guitar, slide guitar
Joel Tepp – bass, harp

Production
Producers: J.D. Souther, Fred Catero
Engineer: Fred Catero
Art direction: Anthony Hudson
Design: Anthony Hudson
Photography: Frank Laffitte

References

J. D. Souther albums
1972 debut albums
Elektra Records albums